The Bertha Eccles Community Art Center (also known as the Bertha Eccles Hall), is a historic resident within the Jefferson Avenue Historic District in Ogden, Utah, United States, that is individually listed on the National Register of Historic Places, (NRHP).

Description

The arts center is located at 2580 Jefferson Avenue and was built in 1893. It is a red brick and red sandstone Victorian home built for mining and banking businessman James C. Armstrong, who sold it in 1896 to Eccles.

It was listed on the NRHP May 14, 1971.

See also

 National Register of Historic Places listings in Weber County, Utah

References

External links

National Register of Historic Places in Weber County, Utah
Victorian architecture in Utah
Buildings and structures completed in 1893